Marie Laissus  (born 7 February 1978) is a French snowboarder.

She was born in Savoie. She competed at the 2006 Winter Olympics, in snowboard cross.

References

External links 
 

1978 births
Living people
Sportspeople from Savoie
French female snowboarders
Olympic snowboarders of France
Snowboarders at the 2006 Winter Olympics